All a Bir-r-r-d is a 1950 Warner Bros. Looney Tunes cartoon directed by Friz Freleng. It was written by Tedd Pierce and directed by Isadore "Friz" Freleng. The short was released on June 24, 1950, and stars Sylvester, Tweety and an unnamed bulldog, who would later become known as Hector the Bulldog.

The title is an adaptation of the familiar train conductor's call, "All aboard!" The instrumental theme used to underscore the motion of the train is "On the 5:15".

Plot

In the opening scene, a train, hauled by an American 4-4-4 tender engine, pulls into the station in a town called Gower Gulch, where Tweety's owner says goodbye to him and entrusts him to the care of a conductor in the baggage car.

Sylvester then notices Tweety in the cage. Sylvester then opens the small door of his carrier and extends his paw to tap on the door of Tweety's cage. Tweety answers, and as Sylvester tries to grab him, the vigilant conductor swats his paw with a cane. The conductor hangs Tweety's cage on a hook in the ceiling to keep him safe and sound and warns Sylvester to behave.

As soon as the conductor leaves the car, Sylvester proceeds to stack various articles of baggage to reach Tweety's cage. When Sylvester tries to grab Tweety again, Tweety finds the emergency cord, and pulls it, which causes the train to screech to an instant halt and sends poor Sylvester sailing through the air across several passenger cars, until he lands in the engine's furnace with the tender behind it. Sylvester quickly leaps out the firebox and runs back to the baggage car, and as he angrily stalks Tweety, Tweety pulls the cord again, and restarts the train, but sends Sylvester through the air into a garbage can lid that Tweety hides. Sylvester starts chasing Tweety, but is stopped by the conductor, who interrupts the chase and orders Sylvester back into his cage.

In the next scene, Sylvester is in his cage next to a bulldog, who starts growling at him. Annoyed, Sylvester shouts "Aaaaaaah, shaddap!" and whacks the bulldog with an umbrella, but is still with Hector growling at him, and yells "Aaaaaaah, shut your big yap, or I'll let you have another". At that moment, the train is approaching an incline and as it ascends, Sylvester slides into the bulldog, who punches him and sends him into the wall. When Sylvester slides back down, the train continues to climb, and sends the bulldog punching the poor cat again. In one occasion, Sylvester mutters "Mother,". As Sylvester starts sliding down yet again, the train starts moving down the incline, sending Sylvester sliding back to the wall and making him think he is safe, until he sees the bulldog sliding down toward him with fist extended to punch him again, which allows Tweety to say, "Poor puddytat!"

Sylvester makes another attempt at stacking the baggage to reach Tweety. Tweety reaches for the emergency cord again, only to see that it has been cut and that Sylvester is holding it. Tweety pulls it anyway, and again sends Sylvester flying through the air, until he nearly lands in the engine's furnace again. Sylvester comes back and snatches Tweety, but when he hears the conductor's footsteps, he stuffs Tweety into a mailbag and leaves it on a hook alongside the track. Sylvester smiles sheepishly as the conductor walks by, then dashes to the observation car to grab the mailbag. He reaches inside and instead of Tweety finds the bulldog, who immediately chases him away.

As Tweety is swinging inside his cage, Sylvester saws a hole in the roof and again finds the bulldog, instead of Tweety, who starts pursuing Sylvester atop the train. Sylvester momentarily eludes the bulldog by ducking into a space between two passenger cars, then both start running in the opposite direction. As Sylvester prepares to knock the bulldog out with a club, the train heads into a tunnel, slamming Sylvester in the face into the bridge above it (This attempt was later used again in Half Fare Hare with Bugs, Ralph and Ed.)

The train finally returns to Gower Gulch station, where Sylvester, disguised as Tweety's "mommy", gets out of a taxi and rushes to the baggage car to claim him. The conductor hands him the cage, which is covered, and Sylvester hurries back to the taxi with the cage. As the taxi drives away, Sylvester uncovers the cage, it was revealed that the bulldog is inside the cage instead of Tweety! The taxi pauses at a mile marker post, and the bulldog rips it out and pummels Sylvester with it as the taxi speeds along the road. As Tweety (everyone forgot it) observes this from the caboose of the train, he sadly says, "Uh-oh, da puddytat's dot anudda pwaymate! It's donna be awfwy wonesome fwom here to Pasadena."

References

External links

1950 films
1950 animated films
1950 short films
Looney Tunes shorts
Sylvester the Cat films
Tweety films
Animated films about birds
Animated films about dogs
Films set on trains
Short films directed by Friz Freleng
Films scored by Carl Stalling
Warner Bros. Cartoons animated short films
1950s Warner Bros. animated short films
1950s English-language films